Vladimir Ivanovich Yakunin (born 30 June 1948) is a Russian businessman and close Vladimir Putin confidant. He was president of Russian Railways from June 2005 to August 2015.

In March 2014, he was placed on the US State Department's list of Russian officials and businessmen sanctioned in the wake the annexation of Crimea.

Early life
Yakunin was born in Melenki in Gus-Khrustalny District, Vladimir Oblast. In 1972, Yakunin graduated from the Leningrad Mechanical Institute where he studied aircraft construction, and specialized in engineering and the maintenance of long-range ballistic missiles. Yakunin's career began in the State Institute for Applied Chemistry in Leningrad, where he worked from 1972 to 1975. In 1975, he joined the Soviet Army.

Career
Between 1985 and 1991, Yakunin was part of the Soviet diplomatic mission to the United Nations, becoming the Mission's First Secretary in 1988. 

He served in the KGB during the Soviet era. 

In the early 1990s, he owned a dacha in Solovyovka, Priozersky district of Leningrad region, on the eastern shore of the Komsomol'skoye lake on the Karelian Isthmus near St. Petersburg. His neighbours there included Vladimir Putin, Andrei Fursenko, Sergey Fursenko, Yuriy Kovalchuk, Viktor Myachin, Vladimir Smirnov and Nikolay Shamalov. On 10 November 1996, together they set up the co-operative society Ozero covering their properties.

Yakunin was the president of Russian Railways from 2005 until 2015.

On 12 December 2012 in Paris, the International Union of Railways General Assembly appointed Yakunin Chairman of the Union. He was unanimously reappointed on 3 December 2014 and continued to serve as head until his retirement.

Yakunin is President of the World Public Forum "Dialogue of Civilizations", an International NGO registered in Vienna, Austria, which he co-founded with C. Kapur of India and N. Papanikolao from Greece/USA. Before it was transformed into a DOC research Institute, World Public Forum "Dialogue of Civilizations" was an initiative to link people from different backgrounds, civilizations, traditions and religions. It organizes the annual Rhodes Forum on Dialogue of Civilizations.

Sanctions 
On 20 March 2014, the United States government issued sanctions in response to what it saw as the Russian government's role in ongoing unrest in Ukraine. The Specially Designated Nationals List (SDN) imposes  a travel ban to the United States, the freezing of all Yakunin's U.S. assets, and a ban on business transactions between American citizens and corporations and Yakunin and any businesses he owns. The Australian Government announced on 19 March 2014 that it would impose a sanctions regime in response to the Russian threat to the sovereignty and territorial integrity of Ukraine. Yakunin was placed on Australia's DFAT consolidated list on 19 June 2014, described as a 'close personal and financial associate of Vladimir Putin'.

Retired from Russian Railways
In August 2015, media reports said Yakunin has retired as head of Russian Railways, but in October, further reports suggested he had been dismissed. Russian and British media have alleged that Yakunin's dismissal was a direct result of his son Andrey Yakunin's decision to apply for UK citizenship.

Personal life
His son Andrey Yakunin owns property in the UK. Andrey ran a UK-based venture capital firm: Venture Investments & Yield Management LLP.

See also
List of individuals sanctioned during the Ukrainian crisis

References

Books
The Treacherous Path: An Insider's Account of Modern Russia (Biteback Publishing Ltd, 2018) [ hard bound]

External links
Vladimir Yakunin's blog
Yakunin: Crowds do not define public will
Putin Confidant Yakunin: 'Russia and the West Are Drifting Apart'
Excerpts From the Interview With Vladimir Yakunin
Q & A: Vladimir Yakunin
Vladimir Yakunin, President of Russian Railways
US accused of 'trying to destroy Russia'
KFAS Interview : Vladimir Yakunin
IBNA Interview: Vladimir Yakunin
Former Kremlin insider expects 2-year economic downturn
Modifying Russia according to Western patterns impossible — Russian Railways ex-CEO
Russian Railways ex-chief sets up international think tank to 'reduce tensions worldwide'
Message of UIC Chairman V. Yakunin on the occasion of the UN Climate Summit 2014
Message by V. Yakunin, UIC Chairman, on the occasion of the UIC General Assembly, Portoroz, 27 June 2014
Address by UIC Chairman Mr. Vladimir Yakunin June 2014
Message by Vladimir Yakunin, UIC Chairman, on the occasion of the UIC General Assembly Paris, 3 December 2014
Vladimir Yakunin: We should stop playing innocent September 29
Under US sanctions, Russian patriot Yakunin speaks in Berlin 
For Putin Ally, U.S. Sanctions Only Add to Anti-Russia Conspiracy Theory
Russia's Yakunin Blasts "Global Financial Oligarchy" on Ukrainian Crisis
Vladimir Iakounine: "Nous avons besoin de garder un partenaire français dans Gefco"
France 24, Business Interview
Russian railway boss Vladimir Yakunin is trying to keep his company, country and President on track
Victor J. Yasmann "Russia: Could Yakunin Be 'First-Called' As Putin's Successor?", Radio Free Europe,  21 June 2006.
Yambaeva, Renata. The Railwayman Kommersant, 15 June 2005.
An interview with Dr. Vladimir Yakunin. Helsinki Times, 7 November 2018/

1948 births
Living people
1st class Active State Councillors of the Russian Federation
Ambassador Extraordinary and Plenipotentiary (Russian Federation)
People from Vladimir Oblast
Russian politicians
Russian people in rail transport
Russian businesspeople in transport
Commander's Crosses of the Order of the Lithuanian Grand Duke Gediminas
Recipients of the Order of Honour (Russia)
Recipients of the Grand Decoration with Star for Services to the Republic of Austria
Grand Officers of the Order of Merit of the Italian Republic
Recipients of the Order of Holy Prince Daniel of Moscow
Grand Crosses of the Order of St. Sava
Academic staff of the Stockholm School of Economics
Russian individuals subject to the U.S. Department of the Treasury sanctions